Kenji Imai may refer to:

, Japanese actor
, Japanese architect